"Still Into You" is a song by American rock band Paramore. It was released on March 14, 2013, as the second single from their self-titled fourth studio album, Paramore. Recorded in 2012 in Los Angeles, California, "Still Into You" is a departure from the sound of their previous single, "Now", and incorporates a lighter pop rock sound, while being described as "sweet" and "sugary".

The song received acclaim from music critics, who have praised the song and Hayley Williams' vocals as "catchy" and "strong and effective", as well as deeming it as one of the songs of the summer of 2013. It is among their most commercially successful singles in the United States, becoming a top-ten hit on the Mainstream Top 40, ranking at number eight on Billboard's Hot Rock Songs, and receiving double-platinum certification in the United States.

Background
Paramore first performed "Still Into You" in Austin, Texas, as part of the South by Southwest festival. The song was then released as a single on March 14, 2013, and was uploaded to Fueled by Ramen's YouTube channel, through a lyric video. The lyrical content finds Williams singing about her relationship with Chad Gilbert of New Found Glory fame and how her feelings seemingly have stayed the same since their first meeting.

In an interview with Spin, Williams stated "'Still Into You' is definitely a love song. It's definitely happy. But to me anyway — and obviously I wrote it so maybe I'm biased, but — it's not a sappy love song. ... We've never done that before, and honestly I don't have a whole lot of experience writing love songs, or anyways lyrics that are like this."

Composition
"Still Into You" has been described as a power pop, pop rock, new wave, and alternative rock song with skeletal guitar lines similar to that of the artist Gotye, alternative dance glockenspiel and synths. It was written in the key of F Major, and lacks a heavy guitar riff, which Paramore is typically known for, and is replaced by a back beat on the drums. James Montgomery at MTV compared the song to the new wave band The Cars, saying it could pass for one of their B-sides.

Critical reception
"Still Into You" was acclaimed by music critics, who commended the song as fun and catchy, and praised Williams' vocals. Marc Zanotti at Music Feeds called the song "a poppy, upbeat, sugary sweet number". Scott Heisel of Alternative Press referred to it one of the best songs on Paramore, saying "There's no question that this is still Paramore, only it's better. The chorus hook will stay in your brain for days at a time, ... and when you throw in the band's newfound embracing of electronics, you find yourself with what will ideally be one of the biggest hits of 2013." Maura Johnston from Popdust gave the song a 5 out of 5, declaring "If there's any justice in the world this'll be a song of the summer, or at least of the late spring". Joseph R. Atilano at Inquirer.net noted that ""Still Into You" is really directed to their youngest fans with its happy-go-lucky lyrics that are as cheerful as they can get and somewhat disarming in their simplicity", considering it better than the previous single "Now".

The song placed at number 95 on Rolling Stone magazine's 100 Best Songs of 2013 list and number 19 on Billboard magazine's 20 Best Songs of 2013. Ed Masley at The Arizona Republic ranked it as the 10th best Paramore song, stating ""Still Into You" is a retro-tastic hook explosion that somehow peaked at No. 83 on Billboard's Hot 100."

Chart performance
The song has sold over 1,000,000 copies in the US as of December 2013. It became one of Paramore's most commercially successful singles to date in the United States, where it reached number 24 on the Billboard Hot 100, and became their first top-ten hit on the Mainstream Top 40 charts. It was included in Billboards year-end charts, at number 100 on the Hot 100 songs of the year.

Music video
The video was directed by Isaac Rentz. When shooting the music video, Jeremy Davis stated "I've realized you can't really consider it making a music video unless you get hurt, because every video, we end up in pain ... It's awesome to do our own stunts; we might as well be Jackie Chan." Taylor York adds "A lot of people would hear the song and assume it would be about the story of people still being in love, but what was so appealing about Isaac's treatment is that he wanted to capture what love feels like ... He had so many ideas, and it definitely jumped out at us."

The official music video for "Still Into You" premiered on April 8, 2013 on Fueled by Ramen's YouTube channel. The music video features Paramore in a boat within a room filled with a balloons; Williams on a bed surrounded by birthday cakes; the trio riding around on bicycles; Williams dancing with ballerinas; and then all of Paramore are outside playing with Roman candles and sparkles with a fireworks show going on in the background. Filming took place at the Texas Federation of Women's Clubs Headquarters.

As of October 2022, the music video for "Still Into You" has over 220 million views on YouTube.

Charts

Weekly charts

Year-end charts

Certifications

References

2012 songs
2013 singles
Paramore songs
Fueled by Ramen singles
American new wave songs
Songs written by Hayley Williams
Songs written by Taylor York